Rainford High School is a coeducational secondary school and sixth form located in Rainford, Merseyside, England.

Rainford High School opened on August 7, 1940, during World War II, as Rainford Senior Council School, with 127 students, one principal, and three teachers. The school was originally a grammar school.

In 1945 the name was changed to Rainford County Secondary School.

During the 1950s and 1960s, the school begun to grow in size. By this point, the school became a Secondary Modern school, entering its pupils for external examinations, including A-Level examinations.

The school became a comprehensive on September 7, 1971, with the old system of grammar schools and secondary modern schools abolished, where the school would choose to adopt the name 'Rainford High School'.

The school received both Technology College and Beacon School status in either the 1999/2000 academic year or the 2000/2001 academic year, and the name was changed to 'Rainford High Technology College'.

The school was rebuilt as part of the UK government's Building Schools for the Future programme, which fully opened in September 2013.

Previously a community school administered by St Helens Council, in September 2017, Rainford High Technology College converted to academy status, and its name was reverted to Rainford High School. The school is now sponsored by and is the founding partner of the Everyone Matters Schools Trust.

In 2020, the school applied to St Helens Council to allow for a new, modular building to be built. St Helens Council accepted planning permission, and in July 2021, with the use of a crane, a new building was airlifted into the site, adding four new classrooms to the school. This also resulted in the temporary closure of some of the school's buildings. This new space opened in September 2021.

In 2021, the school was inspected for the first time as an academy by Ofsted, and it continues to hold a good award.

Rainford's Houses 
The school used to have 4 houses, called Derby, Muncaster, Holland and Lathom. However, in more recent times these houses have not been used.

In 2022, the school brought back the house system. The house names are Compassion, Integrity, Determination, Endeavour and Resilience. The first house event was the 2022 annual Sports Day in July 2022. In January 2023, the school began to hand out House Badges (to lower school students) and House Lanyards (to staff and sixth form students). There are 5 of these, with different symbols, and colours to match the houses.

Rainford High Sixth Form 
The school also operates a Sixth Form College on the same grounds, Rainford High Sixth Form. The Sixth Form shares its specialised facilities (e.g. Music Equipment and Science Labs), and teaching staff with the Rainford High School.

The school day 
Each student is provided with a timetable that tells them where they should be at certain times of the day. These times are as follows:

Monday - Friday (with exceptions):

Form (Registration) - 08:50 - 09:25

Period 1 - 09:25 - 10:25

Period 2 - 10:25 - 11:25

Break - 11:25 - 11:45

Period 3 - 11:45 - 12:45

Period 4 - 12:45 - 14:15

Years 11 and 9 Lunch - 12:45 - 13:15

Year 10 Lunch - 13:15 - 13:45

Year 7 and 8 Lunch - 13:45 - 14:15

Period 5 - 14:15 - 15:15

In addition to these times, any after school and isolation sessions are timetabled:

Isolation (Reflect) - 08:50 - 17:00

Isolation (Restore) - 08:50 - 16:30

After School Detention A - 15:20 - 15:45

After School Detention B - 15:45 - 16:05

After School Detention C - 16:05 - 16:25

Catch-up club (For pupils with over 5 days worth of absences) - 15:15 - 16:30

Rainford High Concert Band
The school's largest organisation was the Concert Band for brass, woodwind, and percussion players. It was open to students of all ages (including Sixth Form students) and practiced weekly in order to play in local primary schools, and also the main showpiece - the 'Music for a Summer's Evening' concert, usually held in July.

A vocal group often performed in the Summer Concert as well. This group offered musical tuition for guitar, piano, brass, percussion and woodwind in order to promote musicianship amongst its students. Sixth Formers are also involved. The group participated in a regular 'Performance Evening' as well as charity music events, such as for Children in Need 2010.

Uniform controversy 
In late 2022, the Senior Leadership Team at Rainford High enforced an existing requirement for pupil's skirts to be 'knee length', as per the uniform policy. The pupils at Rainford refused to follow this rule, and the SLT decided to give the chance for students and staff to come up with a compromise, which was implemented between November 2022 and February half-term. However, due to 'a refusal to comply by approximately 45% of the students' this was reversed back to the knee length requirement, with the exception of Year 11 pupils, of whom's skirts would have to be one finger above the knee.

When pupils returned to the school in February 2023, they were greeted by school staff waiting to check for knee-length skirts, and then sending pupils either into the school to go to form as normal or forcing them to queue up outside the auditorium, where they would then be taken into the auditorium, and would be requested to fix the issue. If the pupil refused to or could not adjust their skirt to an 'appropriate length', their parents would be contacted, and they would be issued with a standards (break time) detention, with apparent threats of suspension if the issue was not resolved within a day. However, the school later denied suspending anyone for infringing the school's uniform policy. A petition was created on change.org on the same day, asking for the school to stop "controlling girls skirts". Within 3 days, the petition reached over 1,000 signatures.

Additionally, it is reported that the student body sent out invitations to a self-titled protest on the social media apps TikTok and Snapchat, on the next day, Wed 22nd Feb. Videos on TikTok can be seen showing what looks like a sit-in, initially starting in the south block, before moving outside. In some videos, boys can be seen wearing skirts in support of the girls. There were reports of a suspected malicious fire alarm activation causing an evacuation. Students have signalled that they will continue to plan & perform protests over the issue. 

The Principal, Ian Young, reports that "The discourse with our young people has been positive and proactive" and that he's "delighted they have spoken with passion on this topic" but that as a school with "consistent standards and expectations" they are limited on what actions they can take.

In response to the protests, on the 24th February, a St Helens Council spokesperson reported to the St Helens Star that "The council has been contacted by parents of pupils from Rainford High", and that they "have listened to their concerns and the council is working with the Academy to see how they can build relationships with the pupils, and in particular the girls."

Awards 
The school has won, and has been nominated for, a number of awards.

Notable former pupils 

 Lee Briers, rugby league footballer for Warrington Wolves
 Conor Coady, footballer, Everton FC
 Andrew Harrison (born 1970), CEO of Carphone Warehouse
 Jonny Lomax, rugby league footballer for St. Helens
 Willy Russell, dramatist and composer

References

External links

 Ofsted

Secondary schools in St Helens, Merseyside
Educational institutions established in 1940
1940 establishments in England
Academies in St Helens, Merseyside
High School